Cameron Corley Sheffield (born February 12, 1988) is a former American football defensive end. He was drafted by the Kansas City Chiefs in the fifth round of the 2010 NFL Draft. He played college football at Troy.

Professional career
Sheffield missed the 2010 NFL season with a neck injury sustained in a tackle with Mike Bell of the Philadelphia Eagles during the preseason.

On August 1, 2013, Sheffield was waived/injured by the Dallas Cowboys. He cleared waivers and was placed on the injured reserve list. On August 7, 2013, Sheffield was released by the team with an injury settlement. 

Sheffield signed with the Edmonton Eskimos on April 8, 2014.

References

External links
Edmonton Eskimos bio 
Kansas City Chiefs bio
Troy Trojans bio

1988 births
Living people
American football defensive ends
American football linebackers
Edmonton Elks players
Kansas City Chiefs players
People from Portal, Georgia
Players of American football from Georgia (U.S. state)
Troy Trojans football players